KQA may refer to:

 Akutan Seaplane Base (IATA airport code for seaplane base in Akutan, Alaska, United States)
 Kenya Airways (ICAO airline code for the flag carrier of Kenya)
 Karnataka Quiz Association (Initialism for the Bangalore-based non-profit quizzing organisation)